Hans Fredrik Jensen (born 9 September 1997) is a Finnish professional footballer who plays as a midfielder and winger for Bundesliga club FC Augsburg and the Finland national team. He began his senior club career playing for Twente, before signing with Augsburg at age 20 in 2018.

Club career

Twente 
Jensen began his senior career at Twente. He made his Eredivisie debut on 6 August 2016, playing the full 90 minutes of a 2–1 defeat against Excelsior.

FC Augsburg 
Jensen signed with Augsburg at age 20 in 2018. He made his Bundesliga debut on 27 October 2018, when he came in as a substitute for Koo Ja-cheol on 68th minute in a 2–1 win against Hannover.

International career 
Jensen made his debut for Finland on 28 March 2017 at the age of 19 in a 1–1 friendly draw over Austria, scoring the equalising goal. He later appeared in the 2018 FIFA World Cup qualification and the UEFA Euro 2020 qualifying campaign, where Finland secured its first-ever place in the main tournament group stage.

Jensen was called up for the UEFA Euro 2020 pre-tournament friendly match against Sweden on 29 May 2021. He played in two international games at the UEFA Euro 2020 tournament while Finland was placed third in Group B following a 2–0 defeat to Belgium on 21 June 2021. They were subsequently knocked out of the tournament.

Personal life 
Jensen's older brother Richard is also a professional footballer and plays for Górnik Zabrze. Jensen is a member of the Swedish-speaking population of Finland.

Career statistics

Club

International 

Scores and results list Finland's goal tally first, score column indicates score after each Jensen goal.

References

External links 

 FC Augsburg official profile
 Fredrik Jensen – SPL competition record
 
 
 

1997 births
Living people
People from Porvoo
Association football wingers
Finnish footballers
Finland international footballers
Finland under-21 international footballers
Finland youth international footballers
FC Twente players
FC Augsburg players
Eredivisie players
Tweede Divisie players
Bundesliga players
UEFA Euro 2020 players
Finnish expatriate footballers
Finnish expatriate sportspeople in the Netherlands
Expatriate footballers in the Netherlands
Finnish expatriate sportspeople in Germany
Expatriate footballers in Germany
Swedish-speaking Finns
Sportspeople from Uusimaa
FC Honka players
Helsingin Jalkapalloklubi players
Jong FC Twente players